Something to Live For is a 1952 American drama film starring Joan Fontaine, Ray Milland, and Teresa Wright, directed by George Stevens, and released by Paramount Pictures. The screenplay by Dwight Taylor was the first to focus on the Alcoholics Anonymous program as a means of overcoming an addiction to liquor.

Plot
Jenny Carey is a budding actress whose developing career is threatened by an increasing dependence on alcohol spurred by her self-destructive romance with theatre director Tony Collins. Reformed drunk Alan Miller attempts to help her by introducing her to AA, but his growing interest in her strains his marriage to Edna, who suspects his motive for assisting Jenny is more than humanitarian.

Principal cast
 Joan Fontaine as Jenny Carey
 Ray Milland as Alan Miller
 Teresa Wright as Edna Miller
 Richard Derr as Tony Collins
 Douglas Dick as Baker

Production notes
Screenwriter Dwight Taylor based the character of Jenny on his mother, stage actress Laurette Taylor, whose struggle with alcoholism kept her from acting for years at a time. She was a longtime friend of director/producer George Stevens' uncle, theatre critic Ashton Stevens.

Joan Fontaine, in San Francisco for the film's premiere, told reporters Jenny Carey was one of her more difficult roles "partly because I've never been drunk." In order to achieve a convincing performance, she said, "I talked to members of Alcoholics Anonymous and watched my friends at cocktail parties."

Reception

Critical response
The New York Times reviewer Bosley Crowther commented: "Mr. Stevens' production and the direction he has given this film . . . are as sleek and professionally efficient as any you are going to see around. But, oh, that script by Dwight Taylor! It is a fearsomely rigged and foolish thing, planted with fatuous situations that even Mr. Stevens can't disguise. And how that long arm of coincidence keeps batting you in the face! At first it is simply embarrassing. Then it is vexingly absurd."

References

External links
 

1952 films
1952 drama films
American drama films
American black-and-white films
Films scored by Victor Young
Films about alcoholism
Films directed by George Stevens
Paramount Pictures films
1950s English-language films
1950s American films